This is a list of public holidays in French Polynesia.

References

Lists of public holidays by country
French Polynesia